Svislach or Svisloch is a town in Grodno Region, Belarus, and the administrative center of Svislach District. It is connected with Vawkavysk by a railroad branch and with Grodno by a highway.

History
Within the Grand Duchy of Lithuania, Svislach was part of Nowogródek Voivodeship. In 1795, Svislach was acquired by the Russian Empire in the course of the Third Partition of Poland.

In 1927, Rabbi Chaim Yaakov Mishkinsky, whose wife Chaya was the granddaughter of Rabbi Naftali Hertz Halperin of Bialystok, was appointed the rabbi of Svislach. He led the community until the Nazis entered in November 1942 murdering the entire Jewish community. Rabbi Mishkinsky's great-granddaughter, Batya Friedman, serves as rebbetzin of Hampstead Garden Suburb Synagogue, London. His great-grandson is Rabbi Yochanan Ivry of Congregation Toras Emes of Staten Island, New York.

Svislach was part of the Second Polish Republic from 1921 until 1939. In September 1939, Svislach was occupied by the Red Army and, on 14 November 1939, incorporated into the Byelorussian SSR. In 1939, there were around 3,000 Jews living in Svislach, along with refugees from western Poland who had settled there after the invasion of Poland. From June 1941 until 17 July 1944, Svislach was occupied by Nazi Germany and administered as a part of Bezirk Bialystok. In July 1941, a ghetto was established in the old Jewish neighbourhood, in the northwest of Svislach. In that area, Jews were also gathered from the village of Golobudy. It was an open ghetto, and the western border of the ghetto's territory ran near the Svislach River. On November 2, 1942, the ghetto was liquidated when the Jews were sent by train to the Vawkavysk transit camp where many massacres occurred. The remaining Jews, mostly elderly and sick, were killed in the Visnik Forest, just outside Svislach.

Residents
Notable residents include:
 Rabbi Aharon Kotler
 Rabbi Samuel Belkin
 David Lewis (Losz), Canadian Rhodes Scholar and federal New Democratic Party leader.

References and notes

External links

 Photos on Radzima.org

Towns in Belarus
Populated places in Grodno Region
Nowogródek Voivodeship (1507–1795)
Volkovyssky Uyezd
Białystok Voivodeship (1919–1939)
Belastok Region
Holocaust locations in Poland
Svislach District